The Gribo–Popoli Power Station, also Gribo Popoli Power Station, is a hydroelectric power station under construction across the Sassandra River, in Ivory Coast. This renewable energy power station is owned and is under development by the Government of Ivory Coast, through its wholly owned subsidiary, CI-Energies, the national electricity utility parastatal company.

With partial funding from the Exim Bank of China, the engineering, procurement and construction (EPC) contract was awarded to Sinohydro, the Chinese hydropower engineering and construction company. CI-Energies is the expected off-taker of the energy generated here. Construction is reported to have started in 2021, with commissioning anticipated in 2024.

Location
Soubré is located in the Soubré Department of the Nawa Region in the Bas-Sassandra District, in southwestern Ivory Coast.

Overview
This power station is one of three hydroelectric power stations 
on the Sassandra River, downstream of the Soubré Hydroelectric Power Station. These three dams, when completed, are expected to add a total of 508 MW to the national generation capacity, according to the Ivorian authorities. The dams are Gribo-Popoli HPP: 112 megawatts, Boutoubré HPP: 150 megawatts and Louga HPP: 246 megawatts.

Construction costs and funding
The estimated cost for the dam and power plant is reported as US$308 million. The Exim Bank of China has lent US$287 million, with the balance contributed by the Ivorian government as equity investment. The table below lays out this information in tabular form.

Other considerations
This power station will increase the national generation capacity by 112 MW of clean energy and will help to propel the county towards 6 Gigawatts of installed capacity by 2030, that the Ivorian government is aiming at.

See also

 List of power stations in Ivory Coast

References

External links
 Approximate Location of Gribo Popoli Hydropower Station As of 3 May 2022.

Nawa Region
Bas-Sassandra District